A British schoolchild, Alfred Dancey was convicted of murder at the age of 14 and transported to Australia in 1850, after he shot two classmates with a pistol he brought to the school.

Dancey grew up in Bedminster, Bristol.

External links
 http://www.convictrecords.com.au/convicts/dancey/alfred/9822
 http://trove.nla.gov.au/newspaper/article/59770599 - Disagrees with the article content above - would be a massive coincidence if there were two such young people in 1850 shooting someone with a pistol.
 http://www.blackkalendar.nl/content.php?key=10857 - Yet another version of the story.
 https://www.flickr.com/photos/brizzlebornandbred/2042728733 - Agrees with item 2 above.
 http://www.convictrecords.com.au/ships/equestrian - Ship on which Dancey was deported.

References

Year of birth missing
Year of death missing
English murderers of children
Convicts transported to Australia